RI or ri may refer to:

People
 Ri, a common Korean surname, a variant romanization of Lee
 Rí (rig), an ancient Gaelic word meaning "king"
 Ri (pronoun), a gender-neutral pronoun in Esperanto
RI, an initialism of Rex Imperator (king-emperor) or Regina Imperatrix (queen-empress), used by those British monarchs who were rulers of both the United Kingdom and the Indian Empire

Places
 Ri (administrative division), an administrative unit in both North Korea and South Korea
 Ri, Orne, a commune of the Orne département in France
 RI, abbreviation of either the Republic of Indonesia or, in the Indonesian language, Republik Indonesia
 Rhode Island, a state within the US (postal abbreviation RI)

Arts and media
 Ri, an augmented second in solfege, used in music education
 Ri, a representation of the second svara in Indian classical music
 Russia Insider, a pro-Kremlin news and propaganda website

Businesses and organizations
 Raffles Institution, a school in Singapore
 Refugees International, an international humanitarian organization
 Rehabilitation International, an international disability rights organization
 Rotary International, international organization of business and professional leaders focused on non-political and non-sectarian humanitarian service
 Royal Institution of Great Britain, an organisation devoted to scientific education and research
 Royal Institute of Painters in Water Colours, a society in the Federation of British Artists
 Chicago, Rock Island and Pacific Railroad (reporting mark RI)
 Tigerair Mandala (IATA airline designator RI)
 Italian Radicals, a political party in Italy

Science, technology, and mathematics
 Ri (prefix symbol), a binary unit prefix symbol
 Referential integrity, a database concept
 Refractive index of an optical medium (in physics/optics) is a number that describes how light propagates through that medium
 Arterial resistivity index, a measure of pulsatile blood flow
 Ring Indicator, a signal in the RS232 serial communications standard
 Rhombicosahedron, a polyhedron, by Bowers acronym
 Residual income, a financial profitability measure of a company
 Reputation Institute, a research and insights company that analyzes the reputation of corporations and places
 Rapid intensification, a phenomenon in which the wind speed of a tropical cyclone increases dramatically in a short period of time
 Research infrastructure, national or international infrastructure open to scientists (e.g. CERN)
 Research institute, an establishment founded for doing research

Other uses
 Ri (cuneiform), a cuneiform sign
 Ri (kana), a Romanization of the Japanese kana り and リ
 Ri, a unit of measurement in Japan and Korea related to the Chinese li
Rock Island District, a commuter rail line on Chicago's Metra (abbreviated as RI on maps and schedules)

See also

Isaac ben Samuel, known as the Ri ha-Zaken, a 12th-century French tosafist and Biblical commentator
Riri (disambiguation)
Ris (disambiguation)
IR (disambiguation)